Haverstock is an area and electoral ward in the London Borough of Camden.

Haverstock may also refer to:

 Haverstock (ward), an electoral ward in the London Borough of Camden
 Haverstock Hill
 Haverstock Hill railway station, opened by the Midland Railway in 1868
 Haverstock School (formerly: Haverstock Comprehensive School), a comprehensive school on Haverstock Hill

People with the surname
 Lynda Haverstock (born 1948), leader of the Saskatchewan Liberal Party